Snežana Hrepevnik (13 November 1948 – 13 May 1981) was a Serbian high jumper who competed in the 1968, 1972 and 1976 Summer Olympics. She finished 14th at the 1968 Summer Olympics, 20th at the 1972 Summer Olympics and 12th at the 1976 Summer Olympics. She was born in Umka and died in Belgrade.

References 
 

1948 births
1981 deaths
Olympic athletes of Yugoslavia
Athletes (track and field) at the 1968 Summer Olympics
Athletes (track and field) at the 1972 Summer Olympics
Athletes (track and field) at the 1976 Summer Olympics
Athletes from Belgrade
Serbian female high jumpers
Yugoslav female high jumpers
Mediterranean Games gold medalists for Yugoslavia
Mediterranean Games silver medalists for Yugoslavia
Athletes (track and field) at the 1967 Mediterranean Games
Athletes (track and field) at the 1971 Mediterranean Games
Athletes (track and field) at the 1975 Mediterranean Games
Universiade medalists in athletics (track and field)
Mediterranean Games medalists in athletics
Universiade gold medalists for Yugoslavia
Medalists at the 1970 Summer Universiade